Maud de Chaworth (2 February 1282 – 3 December 1322) was an English noblewoman and wealthy heiress. She was the only child of Patrick de Chaworth. Sometime before 2 March 1297, she married Henry, 3rd Earl of Lancaster, by whom she had seven children.

Early Life
Maud was the daughter of Sir Patrick de Chaworth, Baron of Kidwelly, in Carmarthenshire, South Wales, and Isabella de Beauchamp. Her maternal grandfather was William de Beauchamp, 9th Earl of Warwick. Her father died on 7 July 1283; he was thought to be 30 years old. His paternal line was from the Castle of Chaources, now Sourches, in the Commune of St. Symphorien, near Le Mans in the County of Maine at the time of the Angevin Empire. Three years later, in 1286, Isabella de Beauchamp married Hugh Despenser the Elder and had two sons and four daughters by him. This made Maud the half-sister of Hugh the younger Despenser. Her mother died in 1306.

Maud was only a year old when her father died, and his death left her a wealthy heiress. However, because she was an infant, she became a ward of Eleanor of Castile, wife of Edward I.

After Queen Eleanor's death in 1290, the King granted the right to arrange Maud's marriage to his brother Edmund Crouchback, Earl of Lancaster on 30 December 1292. Edmund arranged the marriage between Maud and one of his sons, Henry, by Blanche of Artois, niece of Louis IX of France and Dowager Queen of Navarre by her fist marriage

Marriage and issue
Henry and Maud were married sometime before 2 March 1297. Henry was a little older, having probably been born in 1280 or 1281. Maud brought her father's property to the marriage, including land in Hampshire, Glamorgan, Wiltshire, and Carmarthenshire. Maud is often described as the "Countess of Leicester" or "Countess of Lancaster", but she never bore the titles as she died in 1322, before her husband received them. 

Maud and Henry had seven children:
Blanche (c. 1302/1305–1380), Baroness Wake of Liddell
Henry of Grosmont (c. 1310–1361), Duke of Lancaster, one of the great English magnates of the 14th century
Maud (c. 1310 – 5 May 1377), Countess of Ulster
Joan (c. 1312–1345), married John de Mowbray, 3rd Baron Mowbray
Isabel of Lancaster, Prioress of Amesbury (c. 1317 – post-1347), prioress of Amesbury Priory
Eleanor (1318–1372), married John de Beaumont, 2nd Baron Beaumont (died 1342), secondly Richard FitzAlan, 3rd Earl of Arundel
Mary (c. 1320–1362), married Henry de Percy, 3rd Baron Percy

Notes

References
Commire, Anne, and Deborah Klezmer, eds. "Maud Chaworth." Women in the World History. 1999.
Hallam, Elizabeth, ed. Four Gothic Kings. New York, NY: Weidenfeld & Nicolson, 1987. 133, 117, 126
Cantor, Norman F. The Last Knight : The Twilight of the Middle Ages and the Birth of the Modern Era. New York: Free P, 2004.
Binski, Paul. Westminster Abbey and the Plantagenets : Kingship and the Representation of Power, 1200–1400. New York: Yale UP, 1995.

1282 births
1322 deaths
13th-century Welsh nobility
13th-century Welsh women
14th-century Welsh women
13th-century English nobility
14th-century English nobility
13th-century English women
14th-century English women